Franz-Olivier Giesbert (born January 18, 1949) is an American-born French journalist, author, and television presenter.

Giesbert worked for Le Figaro from 1988 to 2000 and for Le Point starting in 2000.

In 2013, he wrote the scenario of a documentary about his relationship with the former president, Nicolas Sarkozy, secrets d’une présidence. ("Nicholas Sarkozy, secrets of a presidency").

Giesbert hosts the cable television, weekly, literary show Le Gai Savoir on Paris Première. In 1999, the show won the Richelieu price of the Association for the Defense of French Language. Since October 2011, he hosts Les Grandes Questions on France 5. And starting in 2012, he also hosts on France 3 the monthly show Le Monde d'après ("The world after").

Controversies 
In 2007, he wrote the biography of Marseille's mobster Jacky le Mat, l'Immortel,  adapted by Richard Berry.

In 2018, he is attacked by Asia Argento and Marlène Schiappa, for explaining actresses presented as crucified and raped by Harvey Weinstein had to know what happened than, analyzed as Gaslighting, Slut shaming and Victim blaming.

In 2021, the pedophile writer Gabriel Matzneff, describes him as an unwavering support. He was criticized by Laure Adler for regretting that people didn't speak french, at the train station of Marseille.

Selected novels
L'Affreux ("The ugly"), Grasset, 1992 (Grand prix du roman de l'Académie française, 1992)
La Souille ("The soil"), Grasset, 1995 (Prix Interallié, 1995)
Un très grand amour ("A great love"), Gallimard, 2010 (Prix Alain Duménil, 2010)
La cuisinière d'Himmler (Himmler's cook"), Gallimard, 2013  (Globe de Cristal Awards winner, 2014)

References

1949 births
Living people
20th-century French journalists
21st-century French journalists
French columnists
French crime fiction writers
French television presenters
French people of American descent
Writers from Wilmington, Delaware
Prix Interallié winners
Grand Prix du roman de l'Académie française winners
French male novelists
20th-century French male writers
French male non-fiction writers
Le Figaro people